The discography of Katherine Jenkins, a Welsh mezzo-soprano singer, consists of twelve studio albums, two soundtrack albums, two compilation albums, eleven singles and three video albums.

Released in April 2004, Katherine's classical chart-topping debut album Premiere, was a mix of old standards including Ave Maria and The Lord Is My Shepherd, plus a smattering of traditional Welsh songs and new interpretations of classic tunes by Handel, Bach, Erik Satie and others. The album made her the fastest-selling mezzo-soprano to date she became the first British classical crossover artist to have two number one albums in the same year. Her second album, Second Nature, reached number 16 in the UK later on in 2004. Next album, Living A Dream followed in 2005 and held the number one position in the classical charts for nearly a year and reached number four in the pop album charts.  Her fourth album, Serenade was released in November 2006 and reached number five in the mainstream charts selling more than 50,000 copies in its first week, a record in the genre.  Fifth album, Rejoice, was released a year later in November 2007 and included songs written specially for her and entered the pop album charts at number three, beating the Spice Girls and Girls Aloud.

In October 2008 Jenkins released Sacred Arias, which was her last album with Universal Music. The Telegraph stated that Jenkins had signed the biggest classical recording deal in history, for $10 million (£5.8 million), with Warner Music. Jenkins released Believe, in October 2009, the first with Warner Music, featuring guest artists Andrea Bocelli, André Rieu and Chris Botti.  She released Daydream in October 2011, This Is Christmas in October 2012 and Home Sweet Home in November 2014.

Albums

Studio albums

Soundtrack albums

Compilation albums

Video albums

Extended plays

Singles

In 2011, four of Jenkins' singles appeared on the U.S. Classical Digital Songs chart: "Time to Say Goodbye" (#3), "The Flower Duet" (#7), "Hallelujah" (#17) and "O Mio Babbino Caro" (#19).  In 2012, two of her singles appeared on the same chart: "Hallelujah" (#3) and "I Believe" with Andrea Bocelli (#13).

Music videos

References

External links
 Katherine Jenkins official website
 
 

Jenkins, Katherine
Jenkins, Katherine
Discography